Sanjay Leela Bhansali (born 24 February 1963) is a Indian director, producer, screenwriter, and music composer who is known for his work in Hindi cinema. One of the most successful filmmakers in Indian cinema, Bhansali is the recipient of several awards, including four National Film Awards and ten Filmfare Awards. In 2015, the Government of India 1st honoured him with the Padma Shri, the fourth highest civilian award.

Bhansali made his directorial debut with Khamoshi: The Musical (1996), for which he received the Filmfare Critics Award for Best Film. He rose to prominence in Indian cinema with the commercially successful and widely acclaimed romantic drama Hum Dil De Chuke Sanam (1999), the romantic drama Devdas (2002) — which received nomination for the Best Film Not in the English Language at British Academy of Film & Television Arts (BAFTA) Awards —  and the drama Black (2005), for all of which he received multiple Best Director Awards and Best Film Awards along with additional Critics Award for Best Film for the latter at Filmfare Awards, and multiple National Film Awards for the latter two. However, he followed it by directing consecutive commercially flop films such as Saawariya (2007) and Guzaarish (2010), however, Guzaarish received positive reviews from critics and audiences.

This changed with his adaptation of Shakespeare's Romeo and Juliet — the tragic romance Goliyon Ki Raasleela Ram-Leela (2013) — opened to positive reviews and strong box office collections, for which he received several awards and nominations. His home production biographical sports film Mary Kom (2014), had him receive his third National Film Award. His period dramas Bajirao Mastani (2015) and Padmaavat (2018) rank among the highest-grossing Indian films of all time. For the former, he won the National Film Award for Best Direction, as well as Best Director and Best Film Awards at Filmfare.

British Academy Film Awards

National Film Awards

Filmfare Awards

Mirchi Music Awards

Screen Awards
 2003: Screen Award for Best Film – Devdas
2003: Screen Award for Best Director – Devdas

International Indian Film Academy (IIFA) Awards
 2000: IIFA Best Film – Hum Dil De Chuke Sanam
2000: IIFA Best Director – Hum Dil De Chuke Sanam
2000: IIFA Best Story – Hum Dil De Chuke Sanam (Shared with Pratap Karvat)
 2000: IIFA Best Screenplay – Hum Dil De Chuke Sanam (Shared with Kenneth Phillips)
 2003: IIFA Best Director – Devdas
2006: IIFA Best Film – Black
 2006: IIFA Best Director – Black
 2014: IIFA Best Director – Goliyon Ki Rasleela- Ramleela – (Nominated)
 2016: IIFA Best Director – Bajirao Mastani

Zee Cine Awards
 2000: Zee Cine Best Director Award – Hum Dil De Chuke Sanam
 2000: Zee Cine Best Film Award – Hum Dil De Chuke Sanam
 2000: Zee Cine Best Story Award – Hum Dil De Chuke Sanam (shared with Prakash Karwat)
 2005: Zee Cine Best Director Award – Black
 2005: Zee Cine Best Film Award – Black
 2015: Zee Cine Best Director Award – Bajirao Mastani

Others
 2000: Zee Gold Award – Best Director – Hum Dil De Chuke Sanam
 2000: Zee Gold Award – Best Screenplay
 2005: Stardust Special Award – Black

Honours
 2015: He was awarded Padma Shri, the fourth highest civilian award of India.

See also
 List of accolades received by Mary Kom
 List of accolades received by Bajirao Mastani
 List of accolades received by Padmaavat

References

External links

Lists of awards received by Indian film director